Tallapoosa County Schools is a school district in Tallapoosa County, Alabama, headquartered in Dadeville.

Schools
Dadeville High School
Edward Bell Career Tech Center
Reeltown High School
Horseshoe Bend School
Dadeville Elementary School
Reeltown Elementary School

References

External links
 

Education in Tallapoosa County, Alabama